Neil Aylmer Kennedy-Cochran-Patrick-Hunter (5 May 1926 in Scotland – 14 October 1994 in Andorra) was a British sailor. He won a silver medal in the 5.5 metre class at the 1956 Summer Olympics.

References 
 

1926 births
1994 deaths
British male sailors (sport)
Olympic sailors of Great Britain
Olympic silver medallists for Great Britain
Sailors at the 1952 Summer Olympics – 5.5 Metre
Sailors at the 1956 Summer Olympics – 5.5 Metre
Olympic medalists in sailing
Medalists at the 1956 Summer Olympics